Papa Eftim II (born Yiorghos Karahisarithis, later changed to Turgut Erenerol; 1920, Ankara – 1991, Istanbul) was the elder son of Papa Eftim I, the founder of the Autocephalous Turkish Orthodox Patriarchate, an unrecognised Orthodox Christian denomination, with strong influences from Turkish nationalist ideology.

Karahisarithis was a doctor of medicine by profession. He became patriarch after Papa Eftim I resigned in 1962 due to ill health. While his father survived until 14 March 1968, Eftim II took over office ruling from 1962 until his death on 9 May 1991. He was succeeded by his younger brother Papa Eftim III.

1991 deaths
Turkish nationalists
20th-century Turkish physicians
Eastern Orthodox Christians from Turkey
Turkish people of Greek descent
Autocephalous Turkish Orthodox Patriarchate
1920 births